David Aron Damane is an American actor, and writer. He made his television debut on Cosby, followed by roles on Law & Order, Law & Order: Special Victims Unit, Chicago P.D., Jett, and Dynasty.  In 2020, he was nominated for the Drama Desk Award for Outstanding Actor in a Musical for his portrayal of "J.J. Brown" in Transport Group's Off-Broadway production of The Unsinkable Molly Brown.

Career
Damane made his television debut in 1996 as "Skip" on Cosby. In 1997, he made his Broadway debut in The Life.  He portrayed "Chingachgook" in the Goodspeed Opera House musical Glimmerglass in 1999.  In 2000, he joined the cast of Broadway's Riverdance as Principal Soloist, and in 2001 played "Isaiah" in the Off-Broadway play Living in the Wind.  Later that year, Mr. Damane played "James Wilson" on Law and Order.

In 2002, Mr. Damane portrayed "Jake" in New York City Opera's Porgy and Bess,  which was also televised on PBS's Live From Lincoln Center.  In 2003, he returned to Broadway in the revival of the musical Big River, produced by Roundabout Theatre Company and Deaf West Theatre.  The following year, he played "DuShawn McGovern" on Law and Order: Special Victims Unit.  In 2005, he joined the national tour of Big River, playing "Jim' for the remainder of its run, and won the 2005 Ovation Award for Best Supporting Actor in a Touring Musical.  He joined the 1st national tour of the musical The Color Purple in 2009.  in 2011 he played "Joe" in Goodspeed Opera House's Show Boat.  He returned to Broadway in 2012 as "George" in the play Don't Dress for Dinner, and as "The General" in The Book of Mormon.  Later that year, he originated the role of "The General" in the Chicago company of the show, until leaving the company in 2016.  In 2013, He began playing "Maurice Owens" on Chicago P.D.

He returned to the New York stage in 2018 as "Husky Miller" in Classic Stage Company's Carmen Jones, and received an AUDELCO Award nomination for Featured Actor in a Musical.  In 2019 he was seen as "Eddie McKay" on the Cinemax series Jett.  He earned a 2020 Drama Desk Award nomination for Outstanding Actor in a Musical for his portrayal of "J.J. Brown" in Transport Group's The Unsinkable Molly Brown.

In 2021, David played Leo Abbott on The CW's Dynasty.  He returned to the New York stage in the fall of 2021 with the new musical, A Turtle on a Fence Post.

Film and Television

Theatre

Voice

References

External links

Living people
20th-century American male actors
21st-century American male actors
American male film actors
American male television actors
American male voice actors
Year of birth missing (living people)